Austria competed at the 1906 Intercalated Games in Athens, Greece. 31 athletes, all men, competed in 46 events in 9 sports.

Medalists

Athletics

Track

Field

Cycling

Diving

Fencing

Shooting

Swimming

Tug of war

All matches were best-of-three pulls.

 Round 1

 Bronze Medal

Weightlifting

Wrestling

Greco-Roman

References

Nations at the 1906 Intercalated Games
1906
Intercalated Games